Alberto Ferreira Paulo (born 1 November 1956), known professionally as Paulo Gonzo, is a Portuguese singer and songwriter. 

His 1997 compilation album Quase Tudo was certified 6-times Platinum by the AFP and is one of the best selling albums in Portugal, with over 240,000 units sold.

Many of his musical compositions have been used as theme songs for Portuguese telenovelas.

Discography

Studio albums

Live albums

Compilation albums

References

External links
Official website of Paulo Gonzo

1956 births
Living people
Golden Globes (Portugal) winners
20th-century Portuguese male singers
People from Lisbon
21st-century Portuguese male singers